Loudon Township is one of the fourteen townships of Carroll County, Ohio, United States. As of the 2020 census, the population was 925.

Geography
Located in the southeastern corner of the county, it borders the following townships:
Lee Township - north
Springfield Township, Jefferson County - east
German Township, Harrison County - southeast
Rumley Township, Harrison County - south
Perry Township - west

No municipalities are located in Loudon Township.

Name and history
Statewide, the only other Loudon Township is located in Seneca County.

At the March, 1836 meeting of the County commissioners the entry made was : "After reading and considering the petition for the erection and alteration of several townships in different parts of the county the following is moved": "A township named Loudon was ordered to be erected from the balance of the said Rock Township and Jefferson Township."

Government

The township is governed by a three-member board of trustees, who are elected in November of odd-numbered years to a four-year term beginning on the following January 1. Two are elected in the year after the presidential election and one is elected in the year before it. There is also an elected township fiscal officer, who serves a four-year term beginning on April 1 of the year after the election, which is held in November of the year before the presidential election. Vacancies in the fiscal officership or on the board of trustees are filled by the remaining trustees.

Education
Students attend the Carrollton Exempted Village School District in most of the township and Edison Local School District near the village of Amsterdam.

References

External links
County website

Townships in Carroll County, Ohio
Townships in Ohio